The Burden (Swedish: Min börda) is a Swedish independent animated drama short film directed by Niki Lindroth von Bahr produced by Malade AB. It was released on 12 June 2017.

The film has won several prizes, including The Annecy Cristal of the Best animated Short at the 41st Annecy International Animated Film Festival, Best International Short Film at the Toronto International Film Festival 2017, and nominated for the Prize for Best Short Film 2017 at the Directors' Fortnight (Quinzaine des Réalisateurs) during Cannes Festival 2017.

Plot
A dark musical enacted in a modern market place, situated next to a large freeway. The employees of the various commercial venues deal with boredom and existential anxiety by performing cheerful musical turns. The apocalypse is a tempting liberator.

Accolades

The short was part of the world touring screening The Animation Showcase 2017.

References

External links
The Burden on Internet Movie Database
The Burden – Official Website
The Burden's Director Official Website – Niki Lindroth von Bahr
Min börda (2017) - Swedish Film Institute (in Swedish)

2017 films
2010s animated short films
Swedish animated short films
Swedish independent films
2017 independent films
2010s Swedish-language films
2010s Swedish films